Domínguez & Cía (BVC: DOM) is a Venezuelan company based in Caracas, founded in 1930. It is a manufacturer of plastic containers, aluminium and tin cans, and cardboard packaging.

References 

Companies listed on the Caracas Stock Exchange
Manufacturing companies of Venezuela
Manufacturing companies established in 1930
1930 establishments in Venezuela